Pseudomonas ficuserectae is a nonfluorescent, Gram-negative, soil bacterium that causes bacterial leaf spot on a  Japanese fig (Ficus erecta), from which it derives its name. Based on 16S rRNA analysis, P. ficuserectae has been placed in the P. syringae group.

References

External links
 Type strain of Pseudomonas ficuserectae at BacDive -  the Bacterial Diversity Metadatabase

Pseudomonadales
Bacterial plant pathogens and diseases
Fruit tree diseases
Bacteria described in 1983